Hans Sutor (28 June 1895 – 9 March 1976) was a German footballer who played as a forward for SpVgg Fürth and 1. FC Nürnberg.

Club career 
Sutor started his career with Fürth before joining Nürnberg in 1920. He went on to win three German football championships with Nürnberg.

International career 
He also represented the German national team. Sutor won 12 caps and scored two goals between 1920 and 1925.

Honours
 German football championship: 1921, 1924, 1925

References

External links
 
 

1895 births
1976 deaths
Footballers from Nuremberg
Association football forwards
German footballers
Germany international footballers
1. FC Nürnberg players
SpVgg Greuther Fürth players